The Northern Maori by-election of 1980 was a by-election for the Northern Maori electorate during the 39th New Zealand Parliament. It was prompted by the resignation of Matiu Rata, a former member of the Labour Party who was establishing a new group, Mana Motuhake. Rata believed that contesting a by-election would give him a mandate for his change of allegiance. In the end, however, his plan backfired when the seat was won by Bruce Gregory, his replacement as the Labour Party candidate.

It was held the same day as another by-election in Onehunga.

Candidates

Labour Party
As Northern Maori was a safe Labour seat, having held it since , there was a large amount of interest in the candidacy. The sheer geographic size of the electorate also caused interest from candidates to be spread widely, Northern Maori stretched from Cape Reinga in the north to Panmure in the south.

A total of 11 candidates were nominated:

John Antonio, a social worker from Mission Bay
Rameka Cope, a community officer from Hokianga
Ivan Erstich, a truck river from Kaitaia
Dr Bruce Gregory, a general practitioner from Kaitaia
Laly Haddon, a former Māori All Black
Te Kairarahi Hui, a Maori welfare officer from Auckland
Hemi Kingi, a teacher from Hamilton
Peter Love, a marketing consultant from Auckland who was previously a candidate for the National Party
Bertram McLean, a naval officer from Auckland
Jon Matthews, a schoolteacher from Kaitaia
William Rawiri, a branch manager from Tinopai

The selection process was completed on 4 May, where Bruce Gregory was selected.

Mana Motuhake
After becoming dissatisfied with the Labour Party's Māori policies Matiu Rata had begun to lose the confidence of his colleagues. Eventually he was deposed as chairman of Labour's Maori Affairs committee and removed from Labour's front bench, prompting him to resign from the party. He then formed his own party, Mana Motuhake which would advocate for Maori self-determination. To help in the establishment of the party, Rata sought a by-election to gain voter approval for his new party and its agenda.

Others
The National Party did not contest the election, a decision that was criticised by Social Credit deputy-leader Jeremy Dwyer as "chickening out". The Values Party decided not to stand a candidate in Northern Maori. Party leader Margaret Crozier endorsed Rata, saying that Values agreed with his aim for Maori self-determination which was already part of Values  Party policy.

Results
The following table gives the election results:

Notes

References
 

Northern Maori 1980
1980 elections in New Zealand
Māori politics
June 1980 events in New Zealand